Birkhoff is a surname. Notable people with the surname include:

George David Birkhoff (1884–1944), American mathematician
Garrett Birkhoff (1911–1996), American mathematician, son of George D.

See also
Birkhoff (crater)
Birkhoff interpolation 
Birkhoff's axioms
Birkhoff's theorem (disambiguation), multiple theorems
Birkhoff decomposition, two different decompositions
Birkhoff algorithm
Poincaré–Birkhoff–Witt theorem